The Park City Miners were a minor league baseball team based in Park City, Utah in 1901. Park City played a partial season as members of the Independent level Inter-Mountain League in 1901, the only year of minor league play for Park City.

History
Minor league baseball was first hosted in Park City, Utah in 1901. The "Park City Miners" became charter members of the Inter-Mountain League. The league was an Independent level league that featured four clubs, all in Utah: the Ogden Lobsters, Salt Lake City White Wings and Railway Ducks / Lagoon Farmers joined the Park City Miners as charter members.

The "Miners" moniker was in reference to local industry, as Park City and the immediate area was home to silver mining, including the Ontario silver mine.

The Park City Miners finished in 4th place in 1901. The Park City franchise disbanded on July 15, 1901 and all remaining games were forfeited. Playing in the newly created four-team league, the Park City Miners had a 3–20 record when the team disbanded. Park City finished behind the Ogden Lobsters (31–10), Salt Lake City White Wings (26–15), Railway Ducks / Lagoon Farmers (23–19) in the standings. The Park City Miners finished with an accredited record of 3–39 under manager H.S. Townsend, after the forfeits were applied. Parks City finished 28.5 games behind the 1st place Ogden Lobsters in the final standings, as Ogden finished with a 31–10 record. The league folded after the 1901 season and Park City has not hosted another minor league team.

Today, the "Miners" moniker has been adopted by the athletic teams at Park City High School.

The ballpark
The name of the Park City home minor league ballpark in 1901 is unknown.

Timeline

Year-by-Year Record

Notable alumni
No alumni of Park City reached the major leagues.

References

Defunct minor league baseball teams
Defunct baseball teams in Utah
Professional sports teams in Utah
Baseball teams established in 1901
Baseball teams disestablished in 1901
1901 establishments in Utah
Park City, Utah
Summit County, Utah